HD 30442 (HR 1527) is a solitary star in the northern circumpolar constellation Camelopardalis. It is faintly visible to the naked eye with an apparent magnitude of 5.47 and is estimated to be 403 light years away from the Solar System.

HD 30442 has a stellar classification of M3 IIIab, indicating that it is a red giant. It is an asymptotic giant branch star currently generating energy using hydrogen and helium shells around a inert carbon core. It has 109% the mass of the Sun and has an enlarged radius of  due to its evolved state. HD 30442 is estimated to have a solar metallicity, with an abundance of iron equivalent to that of the Sun.

It shares a common proper motion with HD 30442, suggesting physical relation, but its parallax indicates otherwise.

References

External links
 HR 1527
 Image HD 30442
 CCDM J04521+6331

Camelopardalis (constellation)
030442
022626
M-type giants
1527
Durchmusterung objects
Asymptotic-giant-branch stars
High-proper-motion stars